Kogenta may refer to:
 Byakko no Kogenta (Kogenta of the white tiger) a character in Onmyō Taisenki
 Kogenta (post-mortem name), the cat that was the victim of the 2002 Japan animal cruelty case